The Racing Fool is a 1927 American silent action film directed by Harry Joe Brown and starring Reed Howes, Ruth Dwyer and Ernest Hilliard.

Cast
 Reed Howes as Jack Harlowe 
 Ruth Dwyer as Helen Drake 
 Ernest Hilliard as Colwyn Kane 
 Billy Franey as Henry Briggs 
 James Bradbury Sr. as Tom Harlowe 
 Miles McCarthy as Cornelius Drake

References

Bibliography
 Munden, Kenneth White. The American Film Institute Catalog of Motion Pictures Produced in the United States, Part 1. University of California Press, 1997.

External links
 

1927 films
1920s action films
American silent feature films
American auto racing films
American action films
American black-and-white films
Films directed by Harry Joe Brown
Rayart Pictures films
1920s English-language films
1920s American films